Grand Duchess Elizabeth Feodorovna of Russia (born Princess Elisabeth of Hesse and by Rhine; 1 November 1864– 18 July 1918), was a German Hessian and Rhenish princess of the House of Hesse-Darmstadt, and the wife of Grand Duke Sergei Alexandrovich of Russia, the fifth son of Emperor Alexander II of Russia and Princess Marie of Hesse and by Rhine.

A granddaughter of Queen Victoria and an older sister of Alexandra, the last Russian Empress, Elisabeth became famous in Russian society for her dignified beauty and charitable works among the poor. After the Socialist Revolutionary Party's Combat Organization assassinated her husband with a bomb in 1905, Elisabeth publicly forgave Sergei's murderer, Ivan Kalyayev, and campaigned without success for him to be pardoned. She then departed the Imperial Court and became a nun, founding the Marfo-Mariinsky Convent dedicated to helping the downtrodden of Moscow. In 1918, she was arrested and ultimately murdered by the Bolsheviks. In 1981, she was canonized by the Russian Orthodox Church Abroad, and in 1992 by the Moscow Patriarchate.

Princess of Hesse

Elisabeth was born on 1 November 1864 as the second child of Ludwig IV, Grand Duke of Hesse and by Rhine, and Princess Alice, daughter of Queen Victoria. Though she came from one of the oldest and most noble houses in Germany, Elisabeth and her family lived a rather modest life by royal standards. The children swept the floors and cleaned their own rooms, while their mother sewed dresses herself for the children. During the Austro-Prussian War, Princess Alice often took Elisabeth with her while visiting wounded soldiers in a nearby hospital. In this relatively happy and secure environment, Elisabeth grew up surrounded by English domestic habits, and English became her first language. Later in life, she would tell a friend that, within her family, she and her siblings spoke English to their mother and German to their father.

In the autumn of 1878, diphtheria swept through the Hesse household, killing Elisabeth's youngest sister, Marie, on 16 November, as well as her mother Alice on 14 December. Elisabeth had been sent away to her paternal grandmother's home at the beginning of the outbreak and she was the only member of her family to remain unaffected. When she was finally allowed to return home, she described the meeting as "terribly sad" and said that everything was "like a horrible dream".

Admirers and suitors

Charming and with a very accommodating personality, Elisabeth was considered by many historians and contemporaries to be one of the most beautiful women in Europe at that time. Her cousin Princess Marie of Edinburgh wrote that "one could never take one's eyes off [Ella]" and that Ella's features were "exquisite beyond words, it almost brought tears to your eyes." Her older cousin Prince Wilhelm of Prussia called her "exceedingly beautiful, in fact she is the most beautiful girl I ever saw." Baroness Sophie Buxhoeveden, her sister's lady-in-waiting, reflected that she was "a very pretty girl, tall and fair, with regular features."

When Elisabeth was a young woman her cousin, Prince Wilhelm of Prussia, fell in love with her. In April 1875, the 16-year-old Wilhelm visited Darmstadt to celebrate Princess Victoria of Hesse and by Rhine's 12th birthday and first expressed interest in the 11-year-old Elisabeth. He wrote in a letter to his mother that "if God grants that I may live till then I shall make her my bride once if you allow it." When he was a student at Bonn University, he often visited his Aunt Alice and his Hessian relatives on the weekends. During these frequent visits, he fell in love with Elisabeth, writing numerous love poems and regularly sending them to her. He proposed to Elisabeth in 1878, but she rejected him.

Lord Charles Montagu, the second son of the 7th Duke of Manchester courted her unsuccessfully.

Henry Wilson, later a distinguished soldier, vied unsuccessfully for Elisabeth's hand. 

The future Frederick II, Grand Duke of Baden, Wilhelm's first cousin, proposed to Elisabeth. Queen Victoria described him as "so good and steady", with "such a safe and happy position," that when Elisabeth declined to marry him the Queen "deeply regretted it". Frederick's grandmother, the Empress Augusta, was so furious at Elisabeth's rejection of Frederick that it took some time for her to forgive Elisabeth.

Other admirers included:

Grand Duke Konstantin Konstantinovich of Russia (the poet KR), who wrote a poem about her first arrival in Russia and the general impression she made to all the people present at the time.
As a young girl, Queen Marie of Romania was very fascinated with her cousin Ella. In her memoirs, she wrote that "her beauty and sweetness was a thing of dreams."
The French Ambassador to the Russian court, Maurice Paleologue, wrote in his memoirs how Elisabeth was capable of arousing what he described as "profane passions".

Ultimately, it was a grand duke of Russia who would win Elisabeth's heart; Elisabeth's great-aunt, Empress Maria Alexandrovna of Russia, was a frequent visitor to Hesse. During these visits, she was usually accompanied by her youngest sons, Sergei and Paul. Elisabeth had known them since they were children, and she initially viewed them as haughty and reserved. Sergei, especially, was a very serious young man, intensely religious, and he found himself attracted to Elisabeth after seeing her as a young woman for the first time in several years.

At first, Sergei made little impression on Elisabeth. But after the death of both of his parents within a year of each other, Elisabeth sympathised with Sergei because she had felt this same grief after the death of her mother. Their other similarities (both were artistic and religious) drew them closer together. It was said that Sergei was especially attached to Elisabeth because she had the same character as his beloved mother. So when Sergei proposed to her in the spring of 1883, she accepted—much to the chagrin of her grandmother Queen Victoria, who tried to persuade Elisabeth to end the engagement. But when Sergei proposed again later in the same year, she accepted him once more, and arrangements for their wedding went ahead.

Grand Duchess of Russia

Sergei and Elisabeth married on 15 (3) June 1884, at the Chapel of the Winter Palace in St. Petersburg; upon her conversion to Russian Orthodoxy, she took the name Elizaveta Feodorovna. It was at the wedding that Sergei's 16-year-old nephew, Tsarevich Nicholas, first met his future wife, Elisabeth's youngest surviving sister Alix.

Elisabeth was not legally required to convert to Russian Orthodoxy from her native Lutheran religion, but she voluntarily chose to do so in 1891. Duchess Marie of Mecklenburg-Schwerin, Elisabeth's Lutheran sister-in-law who had not converted to Russian Orthodoxy, insisted that it was "a disgrace for a German Protestant princess to go over to the Orthodox faith." Kaiser Wilhelm II, who had once been in love with her, declared that she converted because of "an inordinate pursuit of popularity, a desire to improve her position at court, a great lack of intelligence, and also a want of true religiousness."

The new Grand Duchess made a good first impression on her husband's family and the Russian people. "Everyone fell in love with her from the moment she came to Russia from her beloved Darmstadt", wrote one of Sergei's cousins, Grand Duke Konstantin Konstantinovich of Russia (the poet KR). The French Ambassador to the Russian court, Maurice Paleologue, wrote in his memoirs how Elisabeth was capable of arousing what he described as "profane passions". The couple settled in the Beloselsky-Belozersky Palace in St. Petersburg; after Sergei was appointed Governor-General of Moscow by his elder brother, Tsar Alexander III, in 1892, they resided in one of the Kremlin palaces. During the summer, they stayed at Ilyinskoe, an estate outside Moscow that Sergei had inherited from his mother.

The couple never had children of their own, but their Ilyinskoe estate was usually filled with parties that Elisabeth organized especially for children. They eventually became the foster parents of Grand Duke Dmitry Pavlovich and Grand Duchess Maria Pavlovna, Sergei's niece and nephew. Prince Felix Yusupov considered Elisabeth a second mother, and stated in his memoirs that she helped him greatly during the most difficult moments of his life.

Elisabeth was instrumental in the marriage of her nephew-by-marriage, Tsar Nicholas II, to her youngest sister Alix. Much to the dismay of Queen Victoria, Elisabeth had been encouraging Nicholas, then tsarevich, in his pursuit of Alix. When Nicholas did propose to Alix in 1894, and Alix rejected him on the basis of her refusal to convert to Orthodoxy, it was Elisabeth who spoke with Alix and encouraged her to convert. When Nicholas proposed to her again, a few days later, Alix then accepted.

On 17 February 1905, Sergei was assassinated in the Kremlin by the Socialist-Revolutionary Ivan Kalyayev. The event came as a terrible shock to Elisabeth, but she never lost her calm. It was as if her prophecy had come true that "God will punish us severely" which she made after the Grand Duke expelled 20,000 Jews from Moscow, by simply surrounding thousands of families' houses with soldiers and expelling the Jews without any notice overnight out of their homes and the city. Her niece Marie later recalled that her aunt's face was "pale and stricken rigid" and she would never forget her expression of infinite sadness. In her rooms, said Marie, Elisabeth "let herself fall weakly into an armchair...her eyes dry and with the same peculiar fixity of gaze, she looked straight into space, and said nothing." As visitors came and went, she looked without ever seeming to see them. Throughout the day of her husband's murder, Elisabeth refused to cry. But Marie recalled how her aunt slowly abandoned her rigid self-control, finally breaking down into sobs. Many of her family and friends feared that she would suffer a nervous breakdown, but she quickly recovered her equanimity.

According to Edvard Radzinsky, 

Elizabeth spent all the days before the burial in ceaseless prayer. On her husband's tombstone she wrote: 'Father, release them, they know not what they do.' She understood the words of the Gospels heart and soul, and on the eve of the funeral she demanded to be taken to the prison where Kalyayev was being held. Brought into his cell, she asked, 'Why did you kill my husband?' 'I killed Sergei Alexandrovich because he was a weapon of tyranny. I was taking revenge for the people.' 'Do not listen to your pride. Repent... and I will beg the Sovereign to give you your life. I will ask him for you. I myself have already forgiven you.' On the eve of revolution, she had already found a way out; forgiveness! Forgive through the impossible pain and blood -- and thereby stop it then, at the beginning, this bloody wheel. By her example, poor Ella appealed to society, calling upon the people to live in Christian faith. 'No!" replied Kalyayev. 'I do not repent. I must die for my deed and I will... My death will be more useful to my cause than Sergei Alexandrovich's death.' Kalyayev was sentenced to death. 'I am pleased with your sentence,' he told the judges. 'I hope that you will carry it out just as openly and publicly as I carried out the sentence of the Socialist Revolutionary Party. Learn to look the advancing revolution right in the face.' 

Kalyayev was hanged on 23 May 1905.

In 1915, the All-Russian Zemstvo Union was organised under Elisabeth's auspices to provide support for sick and injured soldiers during the First World War.

Religious life

After Sergei's death, Elisabeth wore mourning clothes and became a vegetarian. In 1909, she sold off her magnificent collection of jewels and other luxurious possessions; even her wedding ring was not spared. With the proceeds, she opened the Convent of Saints Martha and Mary and became its abbess. She soon opened a hospital, chapel, pharmacy and orphanage on its grounds. 

Elisabeth and her fellow nuns worked tirelessly among the poor and the sick of Moscow. She often visited Moscow's worst slums and did all she could to help alleviate the suffering of the poor. For many years, her institution helped the poor and the orphans in Moscow by fostering the prayer and charity of devout women. 

In 1916, Elisabeth had what was to be her final meeting with her sister Alexandra, the tsarina, at Tsarskoye Selo. While the meeting took place in private, the tutor to the tsar's children apparently recalled that the discussion included Elisabeth expressing her concerns over the influence that Grigori Rasputin had over Alexandra and the imperial court, and begging her to heed the warnings of both herself and other members of the imperial family.

In 2010, a historian claimed that Elisabeth may have been aware that the murder of Rasputin was to take place and secondly, she knew who was going to commit it when she wrote a letter and sent it to the Tsar and two telegrams to Grand Duke Dmitri Pavlovich and her friend Zinaida Yusupova. The telegrams, which were written the night of the murder, reveal that Elisabeth was aware of who the murderers were before that information had been released to the public, and she stated that she felt that the killing was a "patriotic act."

Death
In 1918, Vladimir Lenin ordered the Cheka to arrest Elisabeth. They then exiled her first to Perm, then to Yekaterinburg, where she spent a few days and was joined by others: the Grand Duke Sergei Mikhailovich; Princes John Konstantinovich, Konstantin Konstantinovich, Igor Konstantinovich and Vladimir Pavlovich Paley; Grand Duke Sergei's secretary, Fyodor Remez; and Varvara Yakovleva, a sister from the Grand Duchess's convent. They were all taken to Alapayevsk on 20 May 1918, where they were housed in the Napolnaya School on the outskirts of the town.

At noon on 17 July, Cheka officer Pyotr Startsev and a few Bolshevik workers came to the school. They took from the prisoners whatever money they had left and announced that they would be transferred that night to the Upper Siniachikhensky factory compound. The Red Army guards were told to leave and Cheka men replaced them. Here they halted. The Cheka beat all the prisoners before throwing their victims into this pit, Elisabeth being the first. Hand grenades were then hurled down the shaft, but only one victim, Fyodor Remez, died as a result of the grenades.

According to the personal account of Vasily Ryabov, one of the executioners, Elisabeth and the others survived the initial fall into the mine, prompting Ryabov to toss in a grenade after them. Following the explosion, he claimed to have heard Elisabeth and the others singing an Orthodox hymn from the bottom of the shaft. Unnerved, Ryabov threw down a second grenade, but the singing continued. Finally a large quantity of brushwood was shoved into the opening and set alight, upon which Ryabov posted a guard over the site and departed.

Early on 18 July 1918, the leader of the Alapayevsk Cheka, Abramov, and the head of the Yekaterinburg Regional Soviet, Beloborodov, who had been involved in the murder of the Imperial Family, exchanged a number of telegrams in a pre-arranged plan saying that the school had been attacked by an "unidentified gang". A month later, Alapayevsk fell to the White Army of Admiral Alexander Kolchak. Lenin welcomed Elisabeth's death, remarking that "virtue with the crown on it is a greater enemy to the world revolution than a hundred tyrant tsars".

Legacy

Fate of the remains
On 8 October 1918, White Army soldiers discovered the remains of Elisabeth and her companions, still within the shaft where they had been murdered. Despite having lain there for almost three months, the bodies were in relatively good condition. Most were thought to have died slowly from injuries or starvation, rather than the subsequent fire. Elisabeth had died of wounds sustained in her fall into the mine, but before her death had still found strength to bandage the head of the dying Prince John with her wimple.  With the Red Army approaching, their remains were removed further east and buried in the cemetery of the Russian Orthodox Mission in Peking (now Beijing), China.  In 1921, the bodies of Elisabeth and of Sister Barbara (Varvara Yakovleva), one of her nuns, were taken to Jerusalem, where they were laid to rest in the Church of Mary Magdalene at Gethsemane.  The Russian Orthodox Mission in Beijing was demolished in 1957 and its cemetery paved over as a parking lot in 1986.

Canonisation
Elisabeth was canonised by the Russian Orthodox Church Outside Russia in 1981, and in 1992 by the Moscow Patriarchate as Holy Martyr Elizabeth Feodorovna. Her principal shrines are the Marfo-Mariinsky Convent she founded in Moscow, and the Saint Mary Magdalene Convent on the Mount of Olives, which she and her husband helped build, and where her relics (along with those of Nun Barbara (Varvara Yakovleva, her former maid) are enshrined.

Commemoration
She is one of the ten 20th-century martyrs from across the world who are depicted in statues above the Great West Door of Westminster Abbey, London, England, and she is also represented in the restored nave screen installed at St Albans Cathedral in April 2015.

A statue of Elisabeth was erected in the garden of her convent in Moscow after the dissolution of the Soviet Union. Its inscription reads: "To the Grand Duchess Elizabeth Feodorovna: With Repentance."

Rehabilitation
On 8 June 2009, the Prosecutor General of Russia officially posthumously rehabilitated Elizabeth Feodorovna, along with other Romanovs: Mikhail Alexandrovich, Sergei Mikhailovich, John Konstantinovich, Konstantin Konstantinovich and Igor Konstantinovich.  "All of these people were subjected to repression in the form of arrest, deportation and being held by the Cheka without charge," said a representative of the office.

Honours
 : Dame of the Order of the Golden Lion, 1 January 1883
 : Dame Grand Cross of the Order of St. Catherine, 1884
 :
 Queen Victoria Golden Jubilee Medal, 1887
 Royal Order of Victoria and Albert, 2nd Class

Ancestry

See also
Canonization of the Romanovs

Notes

Further reading
 Paleologue, Maurice. An Ambassador's Memoirs, 1922
 Grand Duchess Marie of Russia. Education of a Princess, 1931
 Queen Marie of Romania. The Story of My Life, 1934
 Almedingen, E.M. An Unbroken Unity, 1964
 Duff, David. Hessian Tapestry, 1967
 Millar, Lubov, Grand Duchess Elizabeth of Russia, US edition, Redding, California., 1991, 
 Mager, Hugo. Elizabeth, Grand Duchess of Russia, 1998, 
 Zeepvat, Charlotte. Romanov Autumn, 2000, 
 Belyakova, Zoia. The Romanovs: the Way It Was, 2000, 
 Warwick, Christopher Ella: Princess, Saint and Martyr, 2007,  Croft, Christina Most Beautiful Princess — A Novel Based on the Life of Grand Duchess Elizabeth of Russia'', 2008,

External links

Orthodox sources
Life of the Holy New Martyr Grand Duchess Elizabeth, by Metropolitan Anastassy
Pilgrimage to Alapaevsk
Photo Library of Saint Elizabeth
OrthodoxWiki:Elizabeth the New Martyr

Orthodox hymns to Saint Elizabeth
Akathist to the New Martyr Elizabeth
Canon to the Holy and Righteous Nun-Martyrs Elizabeth and Barbara New Martyrs of Russia

Secular sources
Murder of the Romanovs at Alapayevsk
American Reporter Interviews Elisabeth in 1917
HIH Grand Duchess Elisabeth Feodorovna by Countess Alexandra Olsoufieff

1864 births
1918 deaths
Russian grand duchesses by marriage
House of Hesse-Darmstadt
House of Holstein-Gottorp-Romanov
Nuns from the Russian Empire
German nuns
Eastern Orthodox abbesses
Converts to Eastern Orthodoxy from Lutheranism
Christian female saints of the Late Modern era
Russian Empire saints of the Eastern Orthodox Church
Eastern Orthodox royal saints
19th-century Christian saints
20th-century Christian saints
19th-century venerated Christians
20th-century venerated Christians
German emigrants to the Russian Empire
19th-century German women
20th-century German women
Murdered Russian royalty
Executed royalty
Executed Russian women
Extrajudicial killings
Victims of Red Terror in Soviet Russia
People murdered in the Soviet Union
20th-century murders in Russia
Executed German women
German people murdered abroad
German people executed abroad
Executed people from Hesse
Female murder victims
1918 murders in Europe
Burials at the Church of Mary Magdalene
German princesses
Daughters of monarchs